Quebradnotia carchigena is a species of moth of the family Tortricidae. It is found in Carchi Province, Ecuador.

The wingspan is about 17 mm. The ground colour of the forewings is white, preserved as two triangular blotches. The costal area is pale brownish cream and the costal strigulae (fine streaks) are white. The markings are brownish black. The hindwings are whitish at the base tinged with brownish towards the apex.

Etymology
The species name refers to Carchi Province, where it was first found.

References

	

Moths described in 2008
Eucosmini